Fang Yongxiang (born August 1966) is a lieutenant general in the People's Liberation Army of China.

He is an alternate member of the 20th Central Committee of the Chinese Communist Party.

Biography
Fang was born in Xiamen, Fujian, in August 1966, and graduated from Nanchang Army Academy and the PLA National Defence University. He enlisted in the People's Liberation Army (PLA) in September 1985, and joined the Chinese Communist Party (CCP) in September 1986. 

Since July 1989, he served in the 31st Group Army and eventually became political commissar of the 86th Division in 2010. He was director of the Political Department of the 1st Army Group in September 2014 and subsequently a director of a division of the People's Liberation Army General Political Department in June 2015. In 2016, he became deputy director of the Political Work Department of the Eastern Theater Command Ground Force. He was appointed vice minister of Veterans Affairs in March 2018, concurrently serving as assistant director of the Political Work Department of the Central Military Commission. In December 2021, he was commissioned as deputy political commissar of the Southern Theater Command, in addition to serving as political commissar of its Ground Force.

References

1966 births
Living people
People from Xiamen
PLA National Defence University alumni
People's Liberation Army generals from Fujian
People's Republic of China politicians from Fujian
Chinese Communist Party politicians from Fujian
Alternate members of the 20th Central Committee of the Chinese Communist Party